The 2018–2019 Bikarkeppni karla, named Geysisbikarinn for sponsorship reasons, was the 53rd edition of the Icelandic Men's Basketball Cup,  won by Stjarnan against Njarðvík. The competition was managed by the Icelandic Basketball Federation and the final four was held in Reykjavík, in the Laugardalshöll in February 2019, and was broadcast live on RÚV. Brandon Rozzell was named the Cup Finals MVP after turning in 30 points and 4 assists.

Participating teams
Twenty-nine teams signed up for the Cup tournament.

Bracket

Cup Finals MVP

References

External links
2018–2019 Tournament results

Men's Cup
2018–19 in European basketball leagues